Sataspes javanica is a species of moth of the family Sphingidae. It is known from Malaysia, Java and Borneo.

References

Sataspes (moth)
Moths described in 1941